America's Volume Dealer is the sixth studio album by American heavy metal band Corrosion of Conformity, released on September 26, 2000. It was the last album to feature longtime drummer Reed Mullin for nine years until his return in 2010.

Reception 
Steve Huey from AllMusic gave America's Volume Dealer three stars out of five. He described the album as "COC's most radio-friendly record yet", mainly because "the production is more polished, and while the guitars are still high-voltage, the sludgy murk of their most inspiringly heavy records is largely absent."

However, Huey admits that "even if some fans might be disappointed that they [COC] have left the garage, the songs hold up well -- they're melodic and well-crafted, and there's enough variety in the album's pacing to keep it an engaging listen the whole way through."

Track listing
Music by Corrosion of Conformity, lyrics by Pepper Keenan, except where noted.
"Over Me" – 4:19 
"Congratulations Song" – 3:20
"Stare Too Long" – 4:56
"Diablo Blvd." – 3:28 
"Doublewide" – 4:15 
"Zippo" – 4:28
"Who's Got the Fire" – 3:16
"Sleeping Martyr" – 4:59
"Take What You Want" (John Custer) – 3:30
"13 Angels" – 6:35 
"Gittin' It On" – 2:35

Bonus tracks

UK version
"Rather See You Dead" (Legionaire's Disease Band cover)
"Steady Roller (Demo Version)"

Japanese version
"Rather See You Dead" (Legionaire's Disease Band cover)
"World on Fire" (early version; later appeared on In the Arms of God)

Personnel

Corrosion of Conformity
Pepper Keenan – lead vocals, rhythm guitar, cowbell
Woody Weatherman – lead guitar
Mike Dean – bass, Rhodes piano on "13 Angels"
Reed Mullin – drums

Additional personnel
Warren Haynes – slide guitar on "Stare Too Long"
Teresa Williams – backing vocals on "Stare Too Long"
Chen Chapman – backing vocals on "Stare Too Long"
John Custer – additional bass on "Stare Too Long", "Sleeping Martyr", and "Zippo"

Singles

References

Corrosion of Conformity albums
2000 albums
Sanctuary Records albums